Paron may refer to:

Places
 Paron, Yonne, France, a commune
 Paron, Arkansas, United States, an unincorporated community
 Paron State, a non-salute state of the Gwalior Residency in pre-independence India
 Parón, Peru, a mountain in the Andes
 Lake Parón, Peru, in the Andes

People
 Nereo Rocco (1912-1979), Italian football manager and player nicknamed El Paròn (Triestin for "The Master")
 Edmar Paron, bishop of the Roman Catholic Diocese of Paranaguá, Brazil, since 2015

Other uses 
 Paron District, a district in Ngawi Regency, Indonesia
 Ngawi railway station, formerly "Paron Station", a railway station in Ngawi Regency, Indonesia